Presidential elections were held in Honduras in 1860. The result was a victory for José Santos Guardiola, who became the first president elected solely on the basis of the popular vote.

Results
The elections were a contest between conservative incumbent José Santos Guardiola and his liberal vice president José María Lazo Guillén. Guardiola was elected with 90% of the vote.

Aftermath
Following the elections, the General Chamber elected Victoriano Castellanos as Vice President. 
Guardiola and Castellanos took office on 7 February.

References

Honduras
1860 in Honduras
Presidential elections in Honduras
Election and referendum articles with incomplete results